A Century Farm or Centennial Farm is a farm or ranch in the United States or Canada that has been officially recognized by a regional program documenting the farm has been continuously owned by a single family for 100 years or more. Some regions also have Sesquicentennial Farm (150 years) and Bicentennial Farm (200 years) programs.

In most states and provinces, the essential requirement for the award is that the property must have remained in the same family continuously for 100 years or more and currently be a working farm or ranch. Some states stipulate a minimum number of acres or annual agricultural sales.

Background

Canada
In Canada, Century Farm recognition in the province of Ontario was initiated as a Canadian Centennial project of the Junior Farmers' Association of Ontario  (JFAO) in 1967.  In Alberta the Alberta Century Farm & Ranch Award is administered by the Ministry of Agriculture and Rural Development and similar programs are run by individual counties and municipalities.

United States
In the United States, one of the first organizations to begin officially recognizing the farms was the New York State Agricultural Society in 1937. Several states began their programs during the United States Bicentennial in 1976.  Recognition from state to state varies.  It is usually handled by the state's agriculture or natural resources department in conjunction with the American Farm Bureau Federation and the Cooperative extension service of the United States Department of Agriculture, or the state's historical society. In other states, civic groups such as the Knights of Ak-Sar-Ben perform the function.  The awards are frequently done at the state fair.

In Oregon, in addition to century farms and ranches, the Department of Agriculture began to recognize sesquicentennial farms and ranches in 2008.

References

External links
Century Farms and Ranches Web Exhibit from the Oregon Secretary of State

Farms in Canada
Historic farms in the United States
North American awards
Anniversaries
Family history